Najib Gandi (born 23 June 1994) is a French professional footballer who plays as a midfielder for Championnat National 2 club Hyères.

Career
Gandi came through the youth system at FC Nantes. He signed his first professional contract with the club in December 2012. He went on to make five Ligue 1 appearances for the club in the 2017–18 season. 

He quit football for a year after the death of his father and grandfather, leaving Nantes at the end of the 2017–18 season.

In June 2019 he signed a one-year contract, with the option of an additional year, with Lyon-Duchère.

In the summer of 2020, he gave up his professional status, took up a job in fashion and, once COVID-19 lockdown was over, signed for Championnat National 2 side Aubagne.

References

External links
 
 
 

1994 births
Living people
Association football midfielders
French footballers
France youth international footballers
French sportspeople of Tunisian descent
FC Nantes players
Lyon La Duchère players
Aubagne FC players
Hyères FC players
Ligue 1 players
Championnat National players
Championnat National 2 players
Championnat National 3 players